Jayaprakash Radhakrishnan is an Indian film director and actor, who has worked on Tamil and Malayalam language films. He rose to fame through the thriller drama Lens (2016), and has gone on to make feature films including the family dramas The Mosquito Philosophy (2019) and Thalaikoothal (2023).

Career
Jayaprakash Radhakrishnan worked as a software engineer, spending seven years in the United States, before returning to Chennai, hoping to work as an actor in Tamil films. His most notable acting roles came through Urumi (2011) and as Ajith Kumar's friend in Gautham Vasudev Menon's Yennai Arindhaal (2015).

Radhakrishnan made his directorial debut through the bilingual film Lens starring Anand Sami and Vinutha Lal in lead roles alongside himself.  The film was widely released both in Malayalam and Tamil.The film opened to positive reviews, with Radhakrishnan winning the Gollapudi Srinivas National award for Best Debut Director.

Radhakrishnan next worked on The Mosquito Philosophy (2019), an experimental family drama film shot in Tamil, The Mosquito Philosophy (2019) produced by himself. The plot for the film emerged over drinks with Radhakrishnan's friend Suresh, who eventually played the protagonist. The scenes were shot sequentially, beginning with the drive to the nearest liquor store. Radhakrishnan revealed "with no script in hand, everyone responded spontaneously to the developing plot from the depth of their own experiences". His third film Thalaikoothal (2023), produced by YNOT Studios was based on the practice of the same name. Featuring established actors such as Samuthirakani and Kathir, it only had a very limited release.

His next release will be Kadhal Enbadhu Podhu Udamai, a LGBT-romantic drama film starring Lijomol Jose and Anusha in the lead roles.

Filmography
As director

As actor

References

External links

Living people
Tamil film directors
Film directors from Tamil Nadu
Year of birth missing (living people)
21st-century Indian film directors
Tamil screenwriters